Nematocarcinoidea is a superfamily of shrimp, comprising four families – Eugonatonotidae, Nematocarcinidae, Rhynchocinetidae and Xiphocarididae. They share the presence of strap-like epipods on at least the first three pairs of pereiopods, and a blunt molar process.

References

External links

Caridea
Taxa named by Sidney Irving Smith
Arthropod superfamilies